Fairbairn is a surname of Scottish origin which means "a handsome child." Notable people with the surname include:
Andrew Fairbairn (disambiguation), several people
Bill Fairbairn (born 1947), Canadian ice hockey player
Bruce Fairbairn (1949–1999), Canadian musician, songwriter and producer
Carolyn Fairbairn, British business and television executive
Charles Fairbairn, Canadian politician, member for Victoria South (1890–1896)
David Fairbairn (politician) (1917–1994), Australian politician and cabinet minister
David Fairbairn (artist) (born 1949), Australian painter and printmaker
Douglas Fairbairn, co-developer of the Xerox NoteTaker, one of the first portable computers
George Fairbairn (disambiguation), several people
Ian Fairbairn (1896–1968), British financier and rower
Ian 'Walter' Fairbairn, English folk musician
Irene Fairbairn (1899–1974), Australian Girl Guides’ leader
Ivo Fairbairn-Crawford, British athlete who competed in 1908 Olympics. (800m & 1500m)
James Fairbairn (1897–1940), Australian politician, Minister for Air and Civil Aviation, killed in the Canberra air disaster, 1940
John Fairbairn (disambiguation), several people
Joyce Fairbairn (1939–2022), Canadian senator and cabinet minister
Kaʻimi Fairbairn (born 1994), American football player
Nicholas Fairbairn (1933–1995), British politician
Patrick Fairbairn (1805–1874), Scottish theologian
Peter Fairbairn (1799–1861), Scottish engineer
Rhea Fairbairn (1890–1953), Canadian amateur tennis player
Richard Robert Fairbairn (1867–1941), British politician
Robert Fairbairn (1910–1988), Scottish banker and cricketer
Robert Edis Fairbairn (1879–1953), Canadian pacifist
Ronald Fairbairn (William Ronald Dodds Fairbairn, 1889–1964), British psychoanalyst, father of Nicholas Fairbairn
Steve Fairbairn (1862–1938), Australian-born rowing coach active in Cambridge and London
Sydney Fairbairn MC (1892–1943), English cricketer and British Army officer
Thomas Fairbairn, 2nd Baronet (1823–1891), English industrialist and art collector
Thomas McCulloch Fairbairn (politician) (1840–1874), Canadian politician
 Thomas McCulloch Fairbairn (1840-1874), Canadian lawyer and politician
William Fairbairn (Sir William Fairbairn, 1st Baronet of Ardwick, 1789–1874), Scottish engineer
William E. Fairbairn (1885–1960), British soldier, police officer, and WWII commando trainer

See also
Fairburn (disambiguation)

References

Surnames of Scottish origin